Daniel John Hoffman (March 2, 1880 – March 22, 1922) was an American professional baseball player who played center field in the Major Leagues from 1903 to 1911. During his career Hoffman played for the Philadelphia Athletics, New York Highlanders, and St. Louis Browns.

Hoffman was a native of Canton, Connecticut, where he played youth baseball in the village of Collinsville. A scout signed him to play minor league baseball. When playing for the Springfield Ponies in 1902, they were playing a road game against Bridgeport. Hoffman batted a ball into the outfield, which struck and killed a horse.

In 829 games over nine seasons, Hoffman posted a .256 batting average (762-for-2981) with 361 runs, 71 doubles, 52 triples, 14 home runs, 235 RBIs, 185 stolen bases and 226 bases on balls. Defensively, he finished his career with a .951 fielding percentage playing at all three outfield positions.

See also
 List of Major League Baseball annual stolen base leaders

References

External links

 Baseball Reference

1880 births
1922 deaths
Major League Baseball center fielders
Philadelphia Athletics players
New York Highlanders players
St. Louis Browns players
American League stolen base champions
Waterbury Rough Riders players
Springfield Ponies players
Toledo Mud Hens players
Indianapolis Indians players
St. Paul Saints (AA) players
Wilkes-Barre Barons (baseball) players
Baseball players from Connecticut
People from Canton, Connecticut